Middle East Technical University (commonly referred to as METU; in Turkish, Orta Doğu Teknik Üniversitesi, ODTÜ) is a public technical university located in Ankara, Turkey. The university emphasizes research and education in engineering and natural sciences, offering about 41 undergraduate programs within 5 faculties, 105 masters and 70 doctorate programs within 5 graduate schools. METU has more than 120,000 alumni worldwide. The official language of instruction at METU is English.

Over one third of the 1,000 highest scoring students in the national university entrance examination choose to enroll in METU; and most of its departments accept the top 0.1% of the nearly 3 million applicants. METU had the greatest share in national research funding by the Scientific and Technological Research Council of Turkey (TÜBİTAK) in the last five years, and it is the leading university in Turkey in terms of the number of European Union Framework Programme (FP) projects participation. Over 40% of METU's undergraduate alumni choose to pursue graduate studies.

History

Middle East Technical University was founded by a group of İTÜ professors under the name "Orta Doğu Teknoloji Enstitüsü" (Middle East Institute of Technology) on November 15, 1956, to contribute to the development of Turkey and the surrounding countries of the Middle East, Balkans, and Caucasus, by creating a skilled workforce in the natural and social sciences. "Arrangements and Procedures as for the Foundation of METU, Law No 6213" was enacted on January 22, 1957, whereby the current name "Orta Doğu Teknik Üniversitesi" (ODTÜ) was adopted. Finally, the "Foundation Act No 7907", setting forth the particular standing of METU and establishing it as a juridical entity, was enacted on May 27, 1959.

In the early years immediately following its foundation, METU was temporarily hosted in a small building that previously belonged to the Social Security Office of Retirees in Kızılay and another building near the Grand National Assembly of Turkey. In 1963, the university moved to its current location west of Ankara city center, creating the first university campus of Turkey. In 1956, the Department of Architecture initiated the first academic program at METU, followed by the Department of Mechanical Engineering in the spring of 1957. At the start of the 1957–1958 academic year, the Faculty of Architecture, the Faculty of Engineering, and the Faculty of Administrative Sciences were established. In 1959, the establishment of the Faculty of Arts and Sciences was completed. The Faculty of Education launched its academic program in 1982.

Organisation

Faculties and departments
METU has 42 academic departments, most of which are organised into 5 faculties. These are responsible for the undergraduate programs.
Faculty of Architecture: Architecture, City and Regional Planning, Industrial Design
Faculty of Arts and Sciences: Biology, Chemistry, History, Mathematics, Molecular Biology and Genetics, Philosophy, Physics, Psychology, Sociology, Statistics
Faculty of Economic and Administrative Sciences: Business Administration, Economics, International Relations, Political Science and Public Administration
Faculty of Education: Computer Education and Instructional Technology, Educational Sciences, Elementary Education, Foreign Language Education, Physical Education and Sports, Secondary Science and Mathematics Education
Faculty of Engineering: Aerospace Engineering, Chemical Engineering, Civil Engineering, Computer Engineering, Electrical and Electronics Engineering, Engineering Sciences, Environmental Engineering, Food Engineering, Geological Engineering, Industrial Engineering, Mechanical Engineering, Metallurgical and Materials Engineering, Mining Engineering, Petroleum and Natural Gas Engineering

In addition to these, there are the Department of Basic English and the Department of Modern Languages in the School of Foreign Languages; the Technical Vocational School of Higher Education; and, bound directly to the President's Office, the Department of Turkish Language and the Department of Music and Fine Arts.

Graduate schools
The 5 graduate schools present in METU are responsible for the graduate programs.
Graduate School of Applied Mathematics
Graduate School of Informatics
Graduate School of Marine Sciences (Institute of Marine Sciences – IMS)
Graduate School of Natural and Applied Sciences
Graduate School of Social Sciences

Academics

As of 2020, METU has approximately 27,000 students, of which 19,700 are enrolled in undergraduate programs, 4,700 in masters, and 3,000 in doctorate programs. A further 1,500 students are attending programs in the new Northern Cyprus Campus. Over 40% of METU's students go on to graduate school. Each academic year, METU hosts over 1,700 regular international students from 94 different countries; and through 168 Erasmus Programme agreements and 182 bilateral exchange and cooperation agreements with universities abroad (e.g. in Central Asia, Middle East, North America, Australia, Far East and Pacific Region), it sends 350 students and receives 300 students and 50 researchers annually. As of 2010, the university employs 2,500 faculty (professors and associate professors), 500 academic instructors, and over 2,000 research assistants. The number of the alumni exceeds 500,000 (about 350,000 having completed undergraduate programs).

METU has about 40 undergraduate programs within the faculties of Engineering, Architecture, Arts and Sciences, Economic and Administrative Sciences, and Education, and there are 97 masters and 62 doctorate programs available in the graduate schools of Natural and Applied Sciences, Social Sciences, Informatics, Applied Mathematics, and Marine Sciences. METU commonly ranks close to the top among research universities in Turkey, with over one third of the 1,000 highest scoring students in the national university entrance examination choosing to enroll; and most of its departments accepting the top 0.1% of the nearly 1.5 million applicants. In the Webometrics Ranking of World Universities published in July 2009, aiming to measure through web-based publications the institution size, research output, and impact, METU ranked as the world's 435th (1st place within Turkey) among 15,000 universities, being the only university from Turkey to get included among the top 500. Recently, the Times Higher Education World University Rankings published in September 2016 placed METU at the  501–600th position worldwide based on indicators of teaching, research, influence, innovation, and international character, making it one of the six universities from Turkey listed among the top 600 (the other being Bilkent University at number 351–400). The QS World University Rankings 2010 by Quacquarelli Symonds ranked METU as 185th worldwide in the field of engineering and technology, and as 333rd in the field of natural sciences.

The language of instruction at METU is English. All enrolled students are required to have a degree of proficiency in English for academic purposes, and this is assured by a proficiency examination before the commence of studies. Students with unsatisfactory knowledge of English follow a preparatory English education for one year, given by the METU School of Foreign Languages. Two exceptions instructed in Turkish are the Turkish language and the history of Turkish revolution courses mandated by the Council of Higher Education.

International perspective

Researchers from METU actively take part in many COST, EUREKA, NASA, NATO, NSF, UN, World Bank, Jean Monnet, Erasmus Mundus, Leonardo and SOCRATES projects. METU has been involved in 56 European Union 6th Framework Programme (FP6) projects, including the coordination of 12 FP6 and 3 Networks of Excellence projects. Within the 7th Framework Programme (FP7), 33 research projects involve participation of METU, since 2007.

As of 2020, METU has 22 international joint degree programmes with European and American universities at the undergraduate and graduate levels. METU is a member of various associations and networks dealing with international education and exchange, including EUA, EAIE, IIE, GE3, SEFI, and CIEE. The university also actively participates in AIESEC and IAESTE summer internship programs. English as the language of instruction in all its degree programs has greatly facilitated METU's international involvements and accommodation of international students and researchers.

METU continually goes through external assessment, accreditation, and certification by international organizations. In 1991, METU initiated a long-term program to have its engineering programs evaluated by the Accreditation Board for Engineering and Technology (ABET), the recognized U.S. accreditor of college and university programs in applied science, computing, engineering, and technology. This process was concluded with the Faculty of Engineering having all its thirteen undergraduate programs declared as "substantially equivalent" to the ABET accredited programs in the USA. The university has completed the evaluation process of Institutional Evaluation Programme (IEP) of the European University Association (EUA) in 2002.

Because of METU's effort to maintain international standards, the Faculty of Engineering was awarded in 1977 the "Silver Badge of Honor" by the UNESCO International Center for Engineering Education and the "Meritorious Achievement Award in Accreditation Activities" by the Institute of Electrical and Electronics Engineers (IEEE). METU was awarded the international Aga Khan Award for Architecture in 1995 for its forestation program.

Being the pioneer institution of the country to connect to the Internet backbone in the early 1990s, METU also manages Turkey's Country Code Top-level Domain (ccTLD) (the ".tr" domain).

METU library

The METU main library has one of the largest collections in Turkey, containing over 500,000 books classified according to the Library of Congress Classification (LCC) scheme. The library subscribes to 1,500 print journals (170,270 volumes) and it provides access to 76,671 electronic journals, 587,493 electronic books, and 66 electronic reference sources. The library collections also hold over 1,780 book and serial CDs, 1,300 doctoral dissertations and 11,600 masters theses. Abstracts for doctoral dissertations and some master theses from North American colleges and universities and some accredited international universities are also provided, starting from 1861, with full texts available from the year 1997. The library's collections are predominantly in English, but there are also items in Turkish, German, and French.

Campuses

Ankara campus
METU main campus in Ankara, used by the university since 1963, is the first university campus of Turkey. The campus grounds was transformed into a forest with the continuing help of students and volunteers since the foundation of the university. The creation of this distinctive campus with its forest was spearheaded by the METU rector from 1961 to 1969, Kemal Kurdas.

Lake Eymir near Gölbaşı, located 15 kilometers from the academic portion of the campus, is used by the students and faculty for rowing and recreational activities. The campus is accessible by several types of public transport, and the construction of METU subway station of the Ankara Metro on the main entrance to the campus (gate A1) was completed in 2014.

Northern Cyprus campus
The METU Northern Cyprus Campus, the first overseas campus of a Turkish university, 50 km west of North Nicosia in Northern Cyprus, admitted its first students during the academic year 2002–2003, but the doors were officially opened in Northern Cyprus in September 2005.

Erdemli campus
The METU Erdemli campus in Mersin Province on the Mediterranean coast, used by the Institute/Graduate School of Marine Sciences (Deniz Bilimleri Enstitüsü) since 1975, is the first campus of METU outside of Ankara. It is situated about 45 km from Mersin. The campus area is 660,000 m2, close to the shore and surrounded by lemon trees. The laboratory space is about 700 m2. METU-IMS Harbor is an important shelter for marine biological diversity on the Mersin coast. The harbor is the only intact rocky habitat along the long sandy coast.

Live footage from all campuses can be accessed via METU-CAM, a collection of six webcams in METU main campus, one in METU Northern Cyprus Campus, and one in the Graduate School of Marine Sciences, in Erdemli, Mersin.

METU-Technopolis
METU-Technopolis, or METUTECH, is the first science and research park in Turkey. Founded within the campus, it aims to facilitate the development of companies that conduct substantial research and development to produce high-tech products and services through benefiting from METU's research capacity and information pool. Priority is given to companies executing research and development work on information technologies, advanced materials, energy, automotive, chemistry, biology and environment technologies.

As of 2009, the METU-Technopolis project employs about 3,300 personnel, approximately 2,700 of whom are researchers (86% of the total staff are university graduates, and 23% have MSc, MA, or PhD degrees), working in 240 firms. Around 90% of the firms are small and medium enterprises (SMEs), 65% of these are specialized in information and communication technologies, 25% in electronics, and 15% in other sectors such as aerospace, environment, bio-technology, nanotechnology, and advanced materials. The company profile also includes multinationals such as SBS, MAN, Cisco, and Siemens. To promote entrepreneurship and innovation, the incubation center at the METU-Technopolis serves 38 start-ups and micro sized companies, most of which start their life as spin-offs from METU research projects.

METU-Technopolis hosts partners to several European Union Sixth Framework Programme (FP6) projects, such as NICE, SINCERE, ReSIST, SmeInnov8gate and IP4INNO.

Student life and culture

The student life at METU is marked with activities of student societies, frequent political protests, and festivals. The Cultural and Convention Center continually hosts a wide spectrum of cultural events and also regular occurrences such as the METU Jazz Days and METU Art Festival. The event with the largest number of participants is the annual METU Spring Festival, a five-day-long series of open-air concerts and exhibitions held at the main campus.

There are various traits shared by METU students, including the usage of an English–Turkish jargon (METUrkish, ODTÜrkçe as once named by an alumnus artist in an art project) which apparently stems from the fact that English is the language of instruction covering academic processes and student life (and blending into campus language similar to Persian, Arabic and later French in the past blended into Turkish to form Ottoman technical language), which reputedly is not liked much by the students of other universities; and the omnipresent word "Hocam" (meaning "My Teacher"), which is used by METU students to address anyone from bus drivers to senior faculty members. Underneath this phrase lies the philosophy that everyone has something to learn from each other.

The main campus has dormitory capacity for nearly 7,000 students who benefit from the shopping center, banks, post office, and a wide variety of sports facilities, including gymnasiums, tennis courts, basketball and football fields, jogging trails, Olympic-size indoor swimming pool, and an outdoor swimming pool.

Student organizations 
There are numerous student organizations active in METU. Some of these are:

METU Pride march
METU Pride march has been held annually since 2011.

The 2022 Pride march was banned by the university, and the university threatened to summon police if it should proceed.

The 9th annual Pride march held 2019 found students and faculty met with pepper spray, tear gas and rubber bullets used by police. Some were dragged on the ground and others sustained head injuries. 18 students and an academic were arrested and released late in the night on the same day. Following a letter from the Ankara Security Office, arrested students had their KYK scholarships and credits terminated. The arrested were prosecuted, and they were acquitted October 2021, with the university's ban found lacking legal basis.

Notable people

Faculty 

 Behram Kurşunoğlu (1956–1958) – physicist, B.Sc. and M.Sc. at University of Edinburgh and Phd in University of Cambridge, best known for his works on unified field theory and participated in the discovery of two different types of neutrinos in the late 1950s
 Cahit Arf (1967–1980) – known for Arf invariant, B.Sc. and M.Sc. in mathematics at École Normale Supérieure
 Erdal İnönü (president 1970–1971, faculty 1964–1974) – B.Sc. and M.Sc. in physics at Middle East Technical University and Phd. at California Institute of Technology and former Prime Minister of Turkey
 Feza Gürsey (1961–1974) – Theoretic physicist – B.Sc. in mathematics and physics at Istanbul University and Phd at Imperial College London and receiver of Wigner Medal in 1986
 Halil Berktay (1992–1997) – Historian, currently at Sabancı University
 Kemal Derviş – (1973–1976) – economist – Alma Mater: London School of Economics, Princeton University former head of the United Nations Development Programme, former vice-president of the World Bank for the Middle East, former Deputy Prime Minister of Turkey
 Kemal Karpat (1958–1959, 1968–1971) – Historian, currently at University of Wisconsin–Madison
 Hakkı Ögelman (1970–1990) – physicist and astrophysicist 
 Oktay Sinanoğlu –  physical chemistry, molecular biophysics and biochemistry – B.Sc. and Phd at University of California, Berkeley, M.Sc. at Massachusetts Institute of Technology receiver of Humboldt Prize in 1973 and two-time nominee for Nobel Prize in Chemistry.
 Ordal Demokan (1946–2004) – physicist, electrical engineer
 Ulus Baker – Sociologist
Tarik Ogurtani - Experimental and theoretical solid-state physicist, materials scientist. Professor Emeritus of Materials and Metallurgical Engineering @ METU.
 Robert Langlands (1967–1968) – mathematician, B.Sc. at University of British Columbia and Ph.D. at Yale University.

Alumni 

 Abdullah Atalar (B.Eng.) in electronics engineering, M.Sc. and Ph.D. in Stanford University, former president of Bilkent University
 Ahmet Bozer (B.BA.) – vice president of The Coca-Cola Company
 Alev Alatlı (B.S. 1963) – Economics, economist, writer and columnist
 Ali Babacan (B.S. 1988) – Politician and former Deputy Prime Minister of Turkey
 Ataç İmamoğlu (B.Eng.) electrical engineering – Ph.D. Stanford University, former researcher at Harvard University and currently head of Quantum Photonics Group and professor at ETHZ (Swiss Federal Institute of Technology) 
 Aylin Nazlıaka (B.S.) – Economics, businesswoman and politician, Emerging Leaders program at Harvard Kennedy School and former lecturer at Bilkent University, member of Republican People's Party
 Amir Farshad Ebrahimi (Ph.D.), Human rights activist in Iran, journalist
 Burçak Özoğlu Poçan (B.S.) – Mountaineer, one of the four Turkish female summiters of Mount Everest
 Naşide Gözde Durmuş (B.S. 2007) – scientist at Stanford University, recognized among the "World's Top 35 Innovators Under 35" (TR35) in 2015, as a pioneer in biotechnology and medicine, by MIT Technology Review
 Can Dündar (M.S. 1988, Ph.D. 1996) – journalist, B.S. in journalism at London School of Journalism, receiver of Reporters Without Borders prize in 2015
 Cevdet Yılmaz (B.Sc.) – Economics, Ph.D. in Bilkent University and former Deputy Prime Minister of Turkey and minister at Ministry of Development (Turkey)
 Cüneyd Düzyol (1988) – B.Eng. in Civil Engineering, M.Sc. in economics at University of Illinois at Urbana–Champaign and former minister at Ministry of Development (Turkey) 
 Ece Sükan (B.S. 1998) – Turkish model and former editor-at-large at Vogue Turkey
 Elif Şafak – Best-selling Turkish novelist and columnist, receiver of Ordre des Arts et des Lettres in 2010
 Emin Çölaşan – Famous Turkish dissenter journalist/columnist
 Emre Koksal - Computer scientist, electrical engineer and entrepreneur
 Eren Bali (B.S. 2005) – Mathematics and Computer Engineering, founder and CEO of Udemy
 Erdem Duhan Özensoy (B.S. 2009) – Businessman, boardmember of Kimetsan
 Erdem Başçı (B.Sc.) electronic engineering – M.Sc. in Johns Hopkins University, M.Sc., Ph.D. and professor of economics in Bilkent University and head of Central Bank of the Republic of Turkey 
 Erol Gelenbe (B.S. 1966) electronic engineering – MSc. and Ph.D. at Polytechnic Institute of New York University, D.Sc. at Pierre and Marie Curie University and professor at Imperial College, London
 Eylem Elif Maviş (B.S., M.B.A.) – Mountaineer, first Turkish female summiter of Mount Everest
 Fikri Işık – Educator, politician and Ministry of Science, Industry and Technology (Turkey)
 Gülnur Tumbat – Academic of Marketing, mountaineer
 Hakan Topal (B.Sc. 1996, M.Sc. 1999) – Civil Engineering and Gender and Women's Studies – Artist, professor at Purchase College, New York
 Ibrahim Tarik Ozbolat (B.S. 2006, B.S. 2007) Mechanical engineering – academician at the Pennsylvania State University 
 Ilkay Altintas (B.S. 1999, M.S. 2001) Computer engineering - Chief Data Science Officer of San Diego Supercomputer Center
 Javaid Laghari (M.S. EE 1975) – Ph.D. SUNY Buffalo 1980, former senator in Pakistan Senate, former president and project director SZABIST, chairperson Higher Education Commission (HEC)(YOK), Pakistan, coordinator general COMSTECH, commissioner higher education, Ministry of Education, UAE
 Kürşad Tüzmen (B.S. 1981) – M.Sc. in international relations at University of Illinois and former Minister of International Trade and Customs (Turkey)
 Mehmet Ali Talat (M.Sc. 1977) – President of Turkish Republic of Northern Cyprus
 Mehrafza Mirzazad Barijugh (B.S. 2009) – Industrial designer Red Dot Design: Design Concept Best of the Best award 2010
Nabi Avci (B.S. 1986) – board member of Scientific and Technological Research Council of Turkey chairman of the Turkey National Committee of UNESCO, minister of Ministry of National Education (Turkey)
 Müge Fermen (B.S. 1986) – First female aeronautical engineering graduate. MS in aerospace engineering and PhD in mechanical engineering from University of Dayton, Ohio, US. Award-winning program manager in R&D.
 Salih Neftçi (B.S.) – economist, financial expert, author of the book An Introduction to Mathematics of Financial Derivatives
 Serhan Poçan (B.S.) – Mountaineer, summiter of Mount Everest
 Svante Cornell (B.S.) – International relations, founder of Institute for Security and Development Policy, associate professor at Johns Hopkins University – SAIS and associate professor (part-time) at Uppsala University.
 Rita Orji (MS.C, 2009) – Computer Science Professor, Canada Research Chair, Top 150 Canadian Women in Science, Technology, Engineering, and Mathematics (STEM), Member, Royal Society of Canada, Global Young Academy, Top 100 Canada's Most Powerful Women
 Şebnem Ferah (B.S.) – famous rock singer and songwriter
 Süreyya Serdengeçti (B.S. 1979) – economist, former governor of the Central Bank of Turkey
 Taner Akçam (B.S. 1976) – Historian, sociologist and author
 Tülay Adali (B.S. 1987) – electrical engineer, M.Sc. and Phd at North Carolina State University and distinguished university professor at University of Maryland, Baltimore County,  Fellow of the American Institute for Medical and Biological Engineering, Fellow of the Institute of Electrical and Electronics Engineers
 Tugce Aktas (B.S.) – PhD at EMBL, Max Planck Research Group Leader at the Max Planck Institute for Molecular Genetics.
 Tunç Hamarat (B.S.) – chess player – grandmaster and International Correspondence Chess Federation World Champion in 2004
 Turgay Uzer (B.S.) – Theoretical physicist, PhD in Harvard University Regent's professor at Georgia Institute of Technology
 Umran Inan (B.Sc. and M.Sc.) electrical engineering – Ph.D. in electrical engineering at Stanford University and president of Koç University and Aeronautics and Space Administration NASA group achievement award in 1983, 1998 and 2004.
 Yasemin Dalkılıç (B.S.) –  Mathematics – Holder of world records in free diving
 Abzal Saparbekuly (B.S.) – Ambassador of the Republic of Kazakhstan to Turkey
M. Tamer Özsu (B.S. 1974, M.S. 1978) – PhD at Ohio State University; University Professor at University of Waterloo Cheriton School of Computer Science; Fellow of Royal Society of Canada, Fellow of American Association for the Advancement of Science, Fellow of Association of Computing Machinery, Fellow of Institute of Electrical and Electronics Engineers.

See also

 Gazete ODTÜLÜ
 Institute of technology
 List of universities in Ankara
 List of universities in Turkey
 METU Science and Technology Museum
 List of Middle East Technical University rectors

References

External links

 Middle East Technical University (official web site) 
 METU Northern Cyprus Campus (official web site) 
 METU-Technopolis (official web site) 
 METU Campus Map

 
Technical universities and colleges in Turkey
Engineering universities and colleges in Turkey
Educational institutions established in 1956
1956 establishments in Turkey